Kevin O'Neill (16 August 1919 – 8 September 2014) was an Australian cricketer. He played in eighteen first-class matches for South Australia between 1946 and 1950.

See also
 List of South Australian representative cricketers

References

External links
 

1919 births
2014 deaths
Australian cricketers
South Australia cricketers
Cricketers from Adelaide